Liolaemus chiribaya is a species of lizard in the family  Liolaemidae. It is native to Peru.

References

chiribaya
Reptiles described in 2019
Reptiles of Peru
Taxa named by Jack W. Sites Jr.